Sortilège is the debut EP by French heavy metal band Sortilège. It was released by Rave-On Records in 1983.

CD reissue as bonus tracks contains English versions of Bourreau, Gladiateur and Amazone. It also contains three songs from the album Metamorfosis (English release of Métamorphose) which are also in the English language. Blade Killer (English version of Bourreau) was featured on Rave-On Hits Hard, a various artist compilation disc published by Rave-On Records.

Track listing

Bonus tracks

Personnel 
 Christian Augustin - vocals
 Stéphane Dumont - lead guitar
 Didier Demajean - rhythm guitar 
 Daniel Lapp - bass
 Bob Dumont - drums

References

External links 
 http://lamaquinainfernal.blogspot.com/2008/10/sortilege-ep-1983bonus-francia.html

1983 EPs
Sortilège (band) albums